Statistics of National Association Foot Ball League in season 1906–07.

League standings

References
NATIONAL ASSOCIATION FOOT BALL LEAGUE (RSSSF)

1906-07
1906–07 domestic association football leagues
1906–07 in American soccer